The 1911 Middle Tennessee State Normal football team represented the Middle Tennessee State Normal School (now known as Middle Tennessee State University) during the 1911 college football season.

Schedule

References

Middle Tennessee State Normal
Middle Tennessee Blue Raiders football seasons
College football winless seasons
Middle Tennessee State Normal football